The Sukhotyl is a river in Perm Krai and the Komi Republic, Russia, a right tributary of the Kolva, which in turn is a tributary of the Vishera. It starts in the Komi Republic, near the border with Perm Krai and flows into the Kolva  from Kolva's mouth.

References 

Rivers of Perm Krai
Rivers of the Komi Republic